Alanis Morissette (born 1974) is a Canadian-American singer-songwriter, producer and actress.

Alanis may also refer to:

Alanis (album), the debut album by Alanis Morissette
Alanís, a municipality in the city of Seville, Spain
Alanis (film), 2017 Argentine film
Alanis (surname)
Alanis Obomsawin (born 1932), Canadian filmmaker